Jan Brunstedt (born 9 July 1949 in Stockholm, Sweden) is an auto racing driver who competed in the 2008 Porsche Carrera Cup Scandinavia at the age of 59. He is also an airline pilot and managing director of Nordic Aero.

He started racing in karting from 1979. From then, he drove in single-seaters including the Swedish Formula 3 and Swedish Formula Opel championships. In 1996 he finished second in points driving in the Swedish Touring Car Championship. In 1997 he raced an ex-RML Vauxhall Vectra as an independent entry, making the briefest of appearances in the British Touring Car Championship. He only managed to race in two rounds at the second meeting of the year at Silverstone, finishing last in both races.

He once competed in the STCC in 2003 for Bakajev Motorsport in a BMW 320i.

Racing record

Partial Swedish Touring Car Championship results
(key) (Races in bold indicate pole position) (Races in italics indicate fastest lap)

Complete British Touring Car Championship results
(key) (Races in bold indicate pole position - 1 point awarded all races) (Races in italics indicate fastest lap)

External links
 BTCC Pages Profile.
 
 Nordic Aero official website.

1949 births
Living people
British Touring Car Championship drivers
Swedish racing drivers
Blancpain Endurance Series drivers
Swedish Touring Car Championship drivers
British GT Championship drivers
Swedish Formula Three Championship drivers
Commercial aviators
Sportspeople from Stockholm